Arnac-sur-Dourdou (literally Arnac on Dourdou) is a commune in the Aveyron department in the Occitanie region of southern France.

The inhabitants of the commune are known as Arnacois or Arnacoises

Geography
Arnac-sur-Dourdou is a sparsely populated commune in the extreme southern corner of Aveyron some 50 km west by north-west of Saint-André-de-Sangonis and 8 km east by north-east of Murat-sur-Vèbre in the heart of the Lacaune mountains. The western border of the commune is also the border between the departments of Aveyron and Tarn while the southern border is the border between Aveyron and Hérault. Access to the commune is by the D92 road from Brusque in the north which is a tortuous mountain road going to the village and continuing west to change to the D162 at the commune border then south to join the D622 to Murat-sur-Vèbre. The D12 road from Brusque to the south forms the eastern border of the commune and road D174 connects the village to this road. The commune is mountainous and heavily forested.

The Dourdou de Camarès river flows through the commune and the village from east to west gathering numerous tributaries flowing from all corners of the commune.

Neighbouring communes and villages

History
Until the French Revolution the Parish of Arnac was part of the community of Brusque. Saint-Benoît-d'Arnac was then an annex of the Parish of Saint-Pierre-des-Cats (currently the commune of Mélagues). After the Revolution Arnac was part of the commune of Mélagues. It was in 1872 that the commune of Arnac-sur-Dourdou was founded. Today the village consists of many second homes which are often the properties of descendants of the past inhabitants of the village.

Administration

List of Successive Mayors

Population

Cultural Events and Festivals
Arnac Festival in traditional clothes

Sites and monuments
The Church of Saint-Benoît
The Bread oven at the Arnac Mill
The GR 71 passes through the commune

See also
Communes of the Aveyron department

Bibliography
Christian-Pierre Bedel, Lo Pont - Arnac, Brusca, Faiet, Gissac, Melagas, Montanhòl, Pèus-e-Cofolèus, Silvanés, Tauriac, preface by the General Counsel, Christian-Pierre Bedel e los estatjants del canton de Camarés, Rodez, Mission départementale de la culture, 2000, Al canton collection, 320 pages, ill., cover ill., 28 cm, ISSN 1151-8375, BNF 37657611d (Occitan/French)

References

External links
Arnac-sur-Dourdou on Géoportail, National Geographic Institute (IGN) website 
Arnac on the 1750 Cassini Map

Communes of Aveyron